Walter López is the name of:
Walter López (footballer, born 1977) (1977–2015), Honduran footballer
Walter López (footballer, born 1985), Uruguayan footballer
Walter Adolfo López (born 1971), Guatemalan footballer, see Deportivo Marquense
Walter López Reyes, (1940-2022), Honduran politician, Vice President of Honduras
Walter López Castellanos (born 1980), Guatemalan football referee